Jens Ewald (born 30 July 1983 in Schwerte) is a German slalom canoeist who competed at the international level from 2000 to 2008.

Competing at the 2004 Summer Olympics in Athens in the K1 event, he finished 25th in the qualification round, failing to progress to the semifinals.

World Cup individual podiums

1 Oceania Championship counting for World Cup points

References

1983 births
Living people
People from Schwerte
Sportspeople from Arnsberg (region)
Canoeists at the 2004 Summer Olympics
German male canoeists
Olympic canoeists of Germany
21st-century German people